Rodriquez may refer to:

People 

People with the surname Rodriquez include:
 Carmen Espinoza-Rodriquez (born 1970), American singer-songwriter
 , American astronomer and minor planet discoverer

People with the given name Rodriquez include:
 Jacquees (Rodriquez Jacquees Broadnax; born 1994), American R&B singer and songwriter from Atlanta, Georgia

Places 
 Rodriquez Pond

See also 
 
 United States v. Rodriquez, 2008 United States Supreme Court case
 Estate of Rodriquez v. Drummond Co., 2003/2007 lawsuit filed in the United States District Court for the Northern District of Alabama
 Rodríguez (disambiguation)
 Rodrigues (disambiguation)
 Rodríguez (surname) and Rodrigues (surname), people with similar surnames